Psammophora is a genus of plant in the family Aizoaceae. 

It contains the following species:
 Psammophora longifolia,L. Bolus
 Psammophora modesta (Dinter & A. Berger) Dinter & Schwantes
 Psammophora nissenii (Dinter) Dinter & Schwantes (type species)
 Psammophora saxicola H.E.K.Hartmann

Plants in this genus are known for their ability to entrap sand (psammophory), possibly offering protection against being eaten, or  against high wind abrasion or insolation.

References

Aizoaceae
Aizoaceae genera
Taxa named by Kurt Dinter
Taxa named by Martin Heinrich Gustav Schwantes
Taxonomy articles created by Polbot